Navodaya Times   is a Hindi-language newspaper established in 2013 and published from Delhi. It is owned by the Punjab Kesari group (The Hindsamachar Ltd.). It is one of the four newspapers started by the group; the other three are Punjab Kesari, Hind Samachar in Urdu and Jagbani in Punjabi languages.

Prominent columnists

References

External links 

Hindi-language newspapers